The 2022 U23 World Wrestling Championships was the fifth edition of the U23 World Wrestling Championships of combined events and it was held from 17 to 23 October 2022 in Pontevedra, Spain.

Competition schedule
All times are (UTC+2:00)

Medal table

Team ranking

Medal Summary

Men's freestyle

Men's Greco-Roman

Women's freestyle

Participating nations 
551 wrestlers from 56 countries:

  (3)
  (17)
  (1)
  (3)
  (19)
  (1)
  (2)
  (12)
  (19)
  (2)
  (9)
  (4)
  (1)
  (1)
  (5)
  (24) (Host)
  (6)
  (5)
  (13)
  (1)
  (20)
  (17)
  (11)
  (2)
  (17)
  (10)
  (20)
  (7)
  (6)
  (30)
  (30)
  (15)
  (4)
  (4)
  (17)
  (10)
  (1)
  (2)
  (4)
  (3)
  (17)
  (8)
  (8)
  (2)
  (3)
  (8)
  (7)
  (1)
  (5)
  (9)
  (5)
  (3)
  (30)
  (30)
  (30)
  (6)

References

External links
 Official website
 Results Book

World Wrestling U23 Championships
International wrestling competitions hosted by Spain
World U23 Wrestling Championships
 
World Wrestling Championships